The Rae Ministry is the name given to the Executive Council of Ontario under the leadership of Bob Rae, the 21st premier and president of the executive council.

The Executive Council (commonly known as the cabinet) was made up of members of the Ontario New Democratic Party which held a majority of seats in the Legislative Assembly of Ontario.  The cabinet was appointed by the Lieutenant Governor of Ontario on the advice of the premier.  Members of the council are styled "the Honourable" only for the duration of their membership, not for life.

Cabinet of Bob Rae 
Members are listed in order of precedence.

Politics of Ontario
Executive Council of Ontario
1990 establishments in Ontario
Cabinets established in 1990
Cabinets disestablished in 1995